Martin Vitík (born 21 January 2003) is a Czech footballer who plays as a defender for AC Sparta Prague.

Club career
Vitík is a youth product of Králův Dvůr, Tempo Prague and AC Sparta Prague. He made his debut with Sparta Prague in a 4–1 UEFA Europa League loss to Lille on 22 October 2020. On 23 March 2021, he signed his first professional contract with Sparta Prague until 2024.

International career
Vitík is a youth international for the Czech Republic. He was called up to represent the Czech Republic U21 for the 2021 European Under-21 Championship.

Career statistics

Club

References

External links
 
 Fotbal profile
 Sparta Profile

2003 births
Living people
Czech footballers
Czech Republic youth international footballers
Association football defenders
Czech First League players
AC Sparta Prague players
Czech Republic under-21 international footballers